The 1993–94 Scottish Inter-District Championship rugby union Scottish Inter-District Championship saw a change in format from the usual league format to a cup competition. The Anglo-Scots district did not compete in this year's championship.

1993-94 League Table

League table listed for completeness showing points scored.

Results

Semi-finals

Third place play off

The final

Matches outwith the Championship

Trial matches

Blues: 

Reds:

Irish matches

Leinster: 

Scottish Exiles:

References

1993–94 in Scottish rugby union
1993–94
Scot